Chachoura Assembly constituency is one of the 230 Vidhan Sabha (Legislative Assembly) constituencies of Madhya Pradesh state in central India. This constituency came into existence in 1951, as one of the 79 Vidhan Sabha constituencies of the erstwhile Madhya Bharat state.

Incumbent MLA from Chachoura is Lakshman Singh from Indian National Congress.

Overview
Chachoura (constituency number 30) is one of the 4 Vidhan Sabha constituencies located in Guna district. This constituency covers the entire Kumbhraj and Chachoura tehsils and part of Raghogarh tehsil.

Chachoura is part of Rajgarh Lok Sabha constituency along with seven other Vidhan Sabha segments, namely, Raghogarh in this district, Narsinghgarh, Biaora, Rajgarh, Khilchipur and Sarangpur in Rajgarh district and Susner in Shajapur district.

Members of Legislative Assembly
As a constituency of Madhya Bharat state:
 1951: Dwarkadas Ramnarayan, Hindu Mahasabha
As a constituency of Madhya Pradesh state:
 1957: Sagar Singh Sisodia, Indian National Congress
 1962: Prabhu Lal Meena, Independent
 1967: Sagar Singh Sisodia, Swatantra Party
 1972: Krishna Vallabh Gupta, Bharatiya Jana Sangh
 1977: Krishna Vallabh Gupta, Janata Party
 1980: Devendra Singh, Indian National Congress (I)
 1985: Devendra Singh, Indian National Congress
 1990: Ram Bahadur Singh Parihar, Bharatiya Janata Party
 1993: Shivnarayan Meena, Indian National Congress
 1994: Digvijay Singh, Indian National Congress in By-Election as Chief Minister MP
 1998: Shivnarayan Meena, Indian National Congress
 2003: Shivnarayan Meena, Indian National Congress
 2008: Shivnarayan Meena, Indian National Congress
2013: Mamta Meena, Bhartiya Janata Party defeated Shivnarayan Meena by 35,000 Votes.(Breaking Digvijay Singh record as CM)

See also
 Guna district
 Madhya Pradesh Vidhan Sabha

References

Guna district
Assembly constituencies of Madhya Pradesh